Strobilanthes crispa is a shrub which originated from Madagascar, and is now found across south east Asia. It is a member of the family Acanthaceae. The leaves are used traditionally for treatment of cancer and diabetes, usually taken as a tea or infusion of the leaves.

References

crispa
Flora of Java
Flora of the Lesser Sunda Islands
Plants described in 1753